Wilsonville is the name of several communities in the United States of America:
Wilsonville, Alabama
Wilsonville, California
Wilsonville, Connecticut is a village within Thompson, Connecticut.
Wilsonville, Illinois
Wilsonville, Nebraska
Wilsonville, North Carolina
Wilsonville, Oregon